A partial listing of recording artists who currently or formerly recorded for Columbia Records (known in most of the world as CBS Records prior to 1991) include the following list.

0–9

 24kGoldn
 3LW (So So Def/Columbia)
 3rd Bass (Def Jam/Columbia)
 3rd Faze
 50 Cent

A

 Gregory Abbott
 AC/DC
 Acceptance
 Yolanda Adams
 Addrisi Brothers
 Adele (USA/Canada/Latin America from 2008 to 2021 under XL/Columbia, worldwide since 2021 under Melted Stone/Columbia)
 Aerosmith
 The Afghan Whigs
 The Afters
 Todd Agnew
 Alabama 3
 Alex & Sierra
 Jessi Alexander (Columbia Nashville)
 Ora Alexander
 Alice in Chains
 Tha Alkaholiks (Loud/Columbia)
 María Conchita Alonso
 Alvin and the Chipmunks
 Amerie (Rise/Columbia)
 Amil (Roc-A-Fella/Columbia)
 Trey Anastasio
 Anberlin
 Angélique Kidjo
 Anggun
 Eric Andersen
 Jon Anderson
 Keith Anderson (Columbia Nashville)
 Lynn Anderson
 The Andrews Sisters
 Anjani
 Paul Anka
 Marc Anthony
 Anthrax
 Apoptygma Berzerk
 Fiona Apple (Work/Columbia)
 The Apex Theory
 Aqualung
 Tina Arena
 Arcade Fire
 Arizona Zervas
 Toni Arden
 Louis Armstrong
 Artful Dodger
 James Arthur
 The Association
 Astrid Sartiasari (Columbia Jogjakarta)
 Chet Atkins
 Nicole Atkins
 The Ataris
 Atlanta Rhythm Section
 Gene Autry
 The Avant-Garde
 Axis of Justice
 Au/Ra (Loudmouth/Columbia)
 The Automatic Automatic
 Aster Aweke
 Roy Ayers
 Ayo & Teo
 Ayushita (Columbia Jakarta)
 Azteca

B

 Barefoot Bill From Alabama
 Burt Bacharach
 Tal Bachman
 The Bad Plus
 Bad Religion
 Mildred Bailey
 Philip Bailey
 Moe Bandy (Columbia Nashville)
 The Bangles
 R.C. Bannon (Columbia Nashville)
 Bobby Bare (Columbia Nashville)
 Keith Barrow
 John Barry (CBS)
 Karl Bartos
 Blá Blá Blá
 Count Basie
 Batteaux
 Beady Eye (outside US)
 Beastie Boys (Def Jam/Columbia)
 BBB (Columbia Jakarta)
 Bix Beiderbecke
 Bedük
 Bel Canto
 Drake Bell (Nickelodeon/Columbia)
 Marcella Bella
 Regina Belle
 Tony Bennett (RPM/Columbia)
 George Benson
 Cheryl Bentyne (member of Manhattan Transfer)
 Polly Bergen
 Herschel Bernardi
 Leonard Bernstein (Columbia Masterworks)
 Beyoncé (Since 2011, has released her music through her label Parkwood Entertainment/Columbia)
 Big Audio Dynamite
 Big Brother and the Holding Company
 Big L
 Big Pun (Loud/Columbia)
 Big Time Rush (Nickelodeon/Columbia)
 E. Power Biggs (Columbia Masterworks)
 Tony Bird
 Bizarre Inc (Vinyl Solution/Columbia)
 Blackhawk (Columbia Nashville)
 Black Kids
 Art Blakey
 Blaque (Track Masters/Columbia)
 Blink-182
 Blood, Sweat & Tears
 Bloodhound Gang
 Mike Bloomfield
 Blue Öyster Cult
 Arthur Blythe
 The Bob's Burgers Album
 Bobby & The Midnites
 Willie Bobo
 Tommy Bolin
 Claude Bolling (Columbia Masterworks)
 Michael Bolton
 Richard Bona
 Karla Bonoff
 The Boomtown Rats (US)
 Larry Boone (Columbia Nashville)
 Boss (DJ West/Chaos/Columbia)
 Chris Botti
 Pierre Boulez 
 Bow Wow
 Wade Bowen (Sea Gayle/Columbia Nashville)
 David Bowie (ISO Records, licensed to Columbia)
 Fiddlin' Charlie Bowman
 Jimmy Boyd
 Liona Boyd (Columbia Masterworks)
 Susan Boyle (Syco Music/Columbia) (US)
 Bravehearts
 Breathe Carolina
 Bring Me the Horizon
 Britny Fox
 Broken Bells
 Teresa Brewer
 David Bromberg
 The Brothers Four
 Dave Brubeck
 Anita Bryant
 Ray Bryant
 B.T. Express
 Luke Bryan
 The Buckinghams
 Jeff Buckley
 Buckner & Garcia
 Buckshot LeFonque
 Bullet For My Valentine
 Hannibal Buress (Comedy Central/Columbia)
 Carol Burnett
 T-Bone Burnett
 Budapest String Quartet 
 Vernon Burch
 Billy Burnette
 Kate Bush (US)
 Busta Rhymes
 Ferruccio Busoni
 Carl Butler
 Champ Butler
 Pearl Butler
 Billy Butterfield
 Charlie Byrd
 The Byrds
 Peabo Bryson

C

 C+C Music Factory
 Cha Cha
 Francis Cabrel
 Cage Kennylz
 Susan Cagle
 Caitlin & Will (Columbia Nashville)
 Cake
 Calamity Jane (Columbia Nashville)
 Cab Calloway
 Court Yard Hounds
 Dove Cameron
 Paula Campbell
 Stacy Dean Campbell (Columbia Nashville)
 Eddie Cantor
 Jerry Cantrell
 Mariah Carey
 Matt Cardle
 Brandi Carlile
 Roberto Carlos
 Wendy Carlos (Columbia Masterworks)
 Mary Chapin Carpenter (Columbia Nashville)
 Vikki Carr
 Raffaella Carrà
 Jenny Lou Carson
 Mindy Carson
 Carter Family (Original group, 2nd and 3rd generations)
 The Carter Sisters also called "Carter Sisters & Mother Maybelle"
 Anita Carter
 Helen Carter (Okeh)
 James Carter
 June Carter
 Maybelle Carter
 Valerie Carter (transferred to ARC/Columbia for Wild Child)
 Pablo Casals 
 Johnny Cash (Columbia Nashville)
 June Carter Cash (Columbia Nashville)
 Ray Cash
 Rosanne Cash (Columbia Nashville)
 Cecilio & Kapono
 John Cena
 Chad & Jeremy
 The Chainsmokers
 Chairlift
 Chalk FarM
 The Chambers Brothers
 Champaign
 Carol Channing
 Ray Charles
 Charlie (Fantasy Girls album, USA)
 Chayanne
 Cher
 Cherub
 Kenny Chesney (Blue Chair/Columbia Nashville)
 Mark Chesnutt (Columbia Nashville)
 Chevelle
 The Chieftains (outside of Ireland)
 Chicago
 The Chipettes
 Chipmunk
 Christie (CBS)
 Lou Christie
 Susan Christie
 Charlotte Church
 Christine McVie
 The Chuck Wagon Gang
 Circus of Power
 Clams Casino
 The Clancy Brothers and Tommy Makem
 Buddy Clark
 Petula Clark (UK, France and Canada)
 Anne Clark
 The Clash
 David Clayton-Thomas
 Buzz Clifford
 Rosemary Clooney
 Clutch
 The Coasters
 Bruce Cockburn
 David Allan Coe (Columbia Nashville)
 Amber Coffman
 Coheed and Cambria
 Adam Cohen
 Leonard Cohen
 Coin
 Ornette Coleman
 Collie Buddz
 Colosseum
 Arthur Collins
 Columbia Symphony Orchestra
 Chi Coltrane
 Shawn Colvin
 Luke Combs (River House/Columbia Nashville)
 Les Compagnons de la chanson (CBS Disques S.A.)
 Compost
 Jeff Conaway
 John Conlee (Columbia Nashville)
 Harry Connick Jr.
 Ray Conniff
 Consequence
 Aaron Copland 
 The Coral
 Chick Corea
 Jill Corey
 Miranda Cosgrove (Nickelodeon/Columbia)
 Elvis Costello (US)
 Court Yard Hounds
 Billy "Crash" Craddock
 Robert Craft (Columbia Masterworks) 
 Creed
 Rachel Crow
 Rodney Crowell (Columbia Nashville)
 The Cryan' Shames
 Cry of Love
 Crazy Town
 Darren Criss
 CRX
 Xavier Cugat
 Cypress Hill (Ruffhouse/Columbia)
 The Cyrkle
 Miley Cyrus

D

 D Generation
 Da Brat (So So Def/Columbia)
 Daft Punk (Daft Life/Columbia)
 Lacy J. Dalton (Columbia Nashville)
 Vic Damone
 Dangerous Toys
 Danzig
 The Daou 
 Terence Trent D'Arby
 Bobby Darin
 Joe Dassin (CBS Disques S.A. and Columbia of Canada)
 Dave (CBS Disques S.A.)
 Dave Gahan (member of Depeche Mode)
 John Davidson
 Jimmie Davis
 Mac Davis
 Miles Davis
 Tyrone Davis
 Doris Day
 Stu Daye (Pilot/Columbia)
 Jimmy Dean (Columbia Nashville)
 Death
 Death Grips
 Dee Deee (Columbia Jakarta)
 Cole Deggs & the Lonesome (Columbia Nashville)
 Paco de Lucía
 Declan McKenna
 Dej Loaf
 Delaney & Bonnie
 Depeche Mode (Mute/Columbia)
 The Derek Trucks Band
 Destiny's Child (Music World/Columbia)
 Frank De Vol
 Barry De Vorzon
 Dillon Francis
 Al Di Meola
 Neil Diamond
 Dion
 Celine Dion
 Il Divo
 Die Ärzte (1984–1988)
 Dixie Chicks (Wide Open/Columbia Nashville)
 DJ Kayslay
 DMX (former)
 Dr. Dre (former)
 Dr. Feelgood (USA/Canada)
 Dr. Hook & the Medicine Show
 Deryl Dodd
 Tim Dog (Ruffhouse/Columbia)
 Ned Doheny
 Dokken
 Domo Genesis (Odd Future/Columbia)
 The Dorsey Brothers
 Downtown Science (Def Jam/Columbia)
 Sue Draheim
 Drowning Pool
 Duo Tal & Groethuysen 
 Jermaine Dupri (So So Def/Columbia)
 Bob Dylan
 Jakob Dylan
 Ronnie Dyson

E

 Earl Sweatshirt (Tan Cressida)
 Earth, Wind & Fire (ARC/Columbia)
 Walter Egan
 The Electric Flag
 Elaine
 Electric Light Orchestra
 Elkland
 Duke Ellington
 Don Ellis
 Emilio Navaira (Columbia Nashville)
 The Emotions
 Empire cast
 EPMD (Def Jam/RAL/Columbia)
 E.S.T.
 David Essex
 Ethan Bortnick
 Evan and Jaron
 Jackie Evancho (Syco Music/Columbia)
 Evanescence
 Bill Evans
 Tiffany Evans
 George Ezra
 Fleur East

F

 Barbara Fairchild (Columbia Nashville)
 Shelly Fairchild (Columbia Nashville)
 Percy Faith
 Rose Falcon
 Fania All-Stars
 Tyler Farr (Columbia Nashville)
 Eileen Farrell (Columbia Masterworks)
 Dionne Farris
 Fastway
 Rebecca Ferguson (Syco Music/Columbia)
 Nino Ferrer (CBS Disques S.A.)
 Fertig, Los!
 Dominic Fike
 Fingertight
 Firehose
 The Firesign Theatre
 First Aid Kit
 Ella Fitzgerald
 Five for Fighting
 Five Finger Death Punch (Prospect Park)
 Béla Fleck (Columbia Nashville)
 Fleetwood Mac (Blue Horizon/CBS) (outside US/Canada)
 The Flying Burrito Brothers
 Dan Fogelberg
 Foggy Mountain Boys
 Ronnie Foster
 Foster the People
 The Four Lads 
 Zino Francescatti 
 Frankie J
 Aretha Franklin
 Franz Ferdinand
 Fraser & DeBolt
 Frenship
 Janie Fricke (Columbia Nashville)
 David Frizzell (Columbia Nashville)
 The Front
 Michel Fugain (CBS Disques S.A. France)
 Fugees (Ruffhouse/Columbia)
 Full Force
 Future

G

 Jean Gabin (CBS Disques S.A.)
 André Gagnon (Columbia of Canada)
 Eric Gale
 Patsy Gallant (Columbia of Canada)
 Katy Garbi
 Sean Garrett (Roc Nation/Columbia)
 Art Garfunkel
 Judy Garland
 Bradley Gaskin (Columbia Nashville)
 Larry Gatlin (Columbia Nashville, first six albums leased from Monument)
 Marvin Gaye
 Crystal Gayle (Columbia Nashville)
 Stan Getz
 J Geils Band
 Teddy Geiger
 George Gershwin (Columbia Masterworks)
 Gentle Giant (US and Canada, leased from Vertigo and Chrysalis)
 Gesaffelstein
 Art Gillham (The Whispering Pianist) (first electrical recording 1925) 
 Elizabeth Gillies (Nickelodeon/Columbia)
 Terry Gilkyson
 David Gilmour
 Glasvegas
 Glee cast
 Glowie
 The Go! Team
 Goapele (Skyblaze/Columbia)
 Arthur Godfrey
 Gogol Bordello
 Goldfinger
 Benny Golson
 GoodBooks
 Benny Goodman
 Delta Goodrem
 Dexter Gordon
 Eydie Gormé
 Vern Gosdin (Columbia Nashville)
 Gossip
 Glenn Gould (Columbia Masterworks)
 Robert Goulet
 Geolier
 Gowan (Anthem/Columbia)
 Alana Grace
 Jamie Grace
 Stéphane Grappelli
 Diva Gray
 Gregory Gray
 Mark Gray (Columbia Nashville)
 Great Plains (Columbia Nashville)
 Partridge Green
 Vivian Green
 Gene Greene
 Ken Griffin
 Gumball
 A Guy Called Gerald
 Grimes
 Grace Vanderwaal

H

 Bruce Haack
 Haim
 Nina Hagen
 Adelaide Hall
 John Hall (Power released through ARC/Columbia)
 Paul Hampton
 Herbie Hancock
 Hanoi Rocks
 The Harden Trio
 Arlene Harden
 Tim Hardin
 The Harmonicats
 Jimmy Harnen
 Calvin Harris
 Corey Hart (Columbia of Canada)
 Sophie B. Hawkins
 Darren Hayes
 Isaac Hayes
 Wade Hayes (Columbia Nashville)
 Roy Haynes
 Harlem World (So So Def/Columbia)
 Hawks
 Heart
 Heath Brothers
 Heaven's Edge
 Mitch Hedberg (Comedy Central/Columbia)
 Coleman Hell
 Hellyeah
 Ella Henderson (Syco Music/Columbia) (US)
 Fletcher Henderson
 Woody Herman
 Patrick Hernandez
 Ari Hest
 Hey Monday (Decaydance/Columbia)
 The Highwaymen (Columbia Nashville)
 Dan Hill
 Lauryn Hill
 Z.Z. Hill
 The Hi-Lo's
 Mattie Hite
 Hodgy
 Billie Holiday
 Jake Holmes
 The Hooters
 Linda Hopkins
 Dan Hornsby
 Vladimir Horowitz (Columbia Masterworks)
 Johnny Horton
 Cissy Houston
 Marques Houston
 Terrence Howard
 How to Destroy Angels
 Home Free
 Hozier (US)
 Freddie Hubbard
 Hundred Reasons
 Harry Styles

I

 Julio Iglesias
 Jack Ingram (Columbia Nashville)
 Inner City
 Insane Clown Posse (Psychopathic Records; distribution only)
 Irakere
 Iron Maiden (US)
 It's a Beautiful Day
 The Internet (Odd Future/Columbia)

J

 J. Cole (Roc Nation/Columbia)
 The Jacksons
 Mahalia Jackson
 Michael Jackson
 Rebbie Jackson
 Stonewall Jackson
 Jaroslav Jakubovič
 Jagged Edge (So So Def/Columbia)
 Casey James (19/Columbia Nashville)
 Harry James
 Sonny James (Columbia Nashville)
 Tom Jans
 Lauren Jauregui
 Jay Z (Def Jam - until 2009)
 Wyclef Jean
 Lyfe Jennings
 Buddy Jewell (Columbia Nashville)
 J-Kwon
 Joan Jett and the Blackhearts (Blackheart Records)
 Kari Jobe (Integrity/Columbia)
 The Joe Perry Project
 Billy Joel
 J.J. Johnson
 Robert Johnson
 Jim Jones
 Oran "Juice" Jones (Def Jam/Columbia)
 Janis Joplin
 Alexis Jordan
 Josie and the Pussycats
 Journey
 Judas Priest
 Juicy J
 Juilliard String Quartet 
 Pauline Julien
 Junkie XL
 Juno Reactor
 Victoria Justice (Nickelodeon/Columbia)
 Jussie Smollett

K

 Patricia Kaas
 Brenda Kahn
 Roger Wolfe Kahn
 Ini Kamoze
 Christian Kane (Columbia Nashville)
 Madleen Kane
 Miles Kane
 Kasabian
 Katy B (Rinse FM/Columbia)
 Sammy Kaye
 Jorma Kaukonen
 Mat Kearney
 Kenna
 Kep1er (Wake One/Columbia/Legacy) (US/Canada then Worldwide) 
 Raymond Louis Kennedy (ARC/Columbia)
 Alicia Keys
 Kreayshawn
 Kid Capri (Track Masters/Columbia)
 Angélique Kidjo
 Killer Mike (Aquemini/Columbia)
 Killing Joke
 Killradio
 Killswitch Engage
 Carl King
 Peggy King
 King Princess
 Kings of Leon
 The Kinks
 John Kirby
 Gladys Knight
 Gladys Knight & the Pips
 Holly Knight (self-titled album)
 Reggie Knighton (transferred to ARC/Columbia for The Reggie Knighton Band)
 Kool Keith (Ruffhouse/Columbia)
 Al Kooper
 Korn (until 2009)
 Andre Kostelanetz
 Kraftwerk
 Chantal Kreviazuk
 Kris Kross (Ruffhouse/Columbia)
 Toshinobu Kubota
 Kula Shaker
 Leah Kunkel
 Kurious (Hoppoh/Columbia)
 Kay Kyser
 Krewella

L

 Frankie Laine
 Labrinth (US)
 Lake
 Kendrick Lamar
 Lamb of God
 Lambert, Hendricks & Ross
 Miranda Lambert (Columbia Nashville)
 George Lamond
 Catherine Lara
 The Lashes
 The Laughing Dogs
 Cinta Laura
 Steve Lawrence
 Hubert Laws
 LCD Soundsystem
 LSD
 Denis Leary (Comedy Central/Columbia)
 Lecrae
 Michele Lee
 Mylon LeFevre (Columbia and CBS Associated)
 Leftfield (Hard Hands/Columbia)
 John Legend
 Len
 Gérard Lenorman
 LÉON
 Lewis Del Mar
 Lauren Jauregui
 Ted Lewis
 Monique Leyrac
 Prudence Liew
 Lil' Flip (Loud/Columbia)
 Lil' Fizz
 Lil Nas X
 Lil' Peep
 Lil Tjay
 Lil' Xan
 Mark Lindsay
 Lindsey Buckingham
 Lisa Lisa and Cult Jam
 LL Cool J (Def Jam/Columbia)
 Lo Fidelity Allstars (Skint/Columbia)
 Kenny Loggins
 Loggins and Messina
 Little Mix (US)
 London String Quartet (Columbia Masterworks)
 Lone Star
 Brice Long (Columbia Nashville)
 Bobby Lord (Columbia Nashville)
 Lord Tariq and Peter Gunz
 Lostprophets
 Lous and the Yakuza
 Lovedrug
 The Love Affair (outside US)
 Love/Hate
 Loverboy
 Nick Lowe (US)
 LeToya Luckett
 Lucky Ali
 LunchMoney Lewis (Kemosabe/Columbia)
 Jimmie Lunceford
 Cheryl Lynn

M

 MN8
 M.I.A.
 Macklemore
 Macklemore and Ryan Lewis
 Magic Man
 Magnetic Man
 Mad Cobra
 Madeon
 Taj Mahal
 Mahavishnu Orchestra
 Mahogany Rush
 Natalie Maines
 Manic Street Preachers
 Barbara Mandrell (Columbia Nashville)
 Chuck Mangione
 The Manhattan Transfer (1991–92)
 The Manhattans
 Barry Manilow
 Frank Marino
 Marmalade
 Branford Marsalis
 Ellis Marsalis Jr.
 Wynton Marsalis
 Martika
 Ricky Martin (C2/Columbia)
 Mary Mary
 Ma$e (So So Def/Columbia)
 Mashmakhan
 Jackie Mason
 Nick Mason (outside Europe)
 Johnny Mathis
 Iain Matthews (1976–77)
 Matthews, Wright & King (Columbia Nashville)
 Maxwell
 John Mayer (Aware/Columbia)
 Rachael MacFarlane
 Seth MacFarlane
 Paul McCartney (US/Canada, after 1979)
 Jennette McCurdy (Nickelodeon/Columbia)
 Roger McGuinn
 Joey McIntyre (C2/Columbia)
 Nellie McKay
 Scott McKenzie
 John McLaughlin
 Marshall McLuhan
 Katharine McPhee
 Peter McPoland
 Carmen McRae
 MC Serch (Def Jam/Chaos/Columbia)
 Mecano
 Mark Medlock
 Megadeth
 John Mellencamp
 Memento
 Men at Work
 Maria Mena
 Tim Mensy (Columbia Nashville)
 Harold Melvin & the Blue Notes (Philadelphia International/Columbia)
 Freddie Mercury
 Metallica (until 1991)
 MFSB (Philadelphia International/Columbia)
 MGMT
 George Michael (US/Canada)
 Lea Michele
 Midi Rain (Vinyl Solution/Columbia)
 Bette Midler
 Midtown
 Mile
 Miley Cyrus
 Mitch Miller
 T. Mills
 Nathan Milstein (Columbia Masterworks)
 Charles Mingus 
 Liza Minnelli 
 Misfits
 Guy Mitchell
 Dimitri Mitropoulos 
 MKTO
 Ms Mr
 Mr. T
 Mobb Deep (Loud/Columbia)
 Moby
 Moby Grape
 Don Moen (Integrity/Columbia)
 Katy Moffatt
 Eddie Money (Wolfgang/Columbia)
 Thelonious Monk
 Ashley Monroe (Columbia Nashville)
 Monsta X (Epic/Columbia) (UK)
 Montgomery Gentry (Columbia Nashville)
 Sara Montiel
 Jackie Moore
 M.O.P.
Megan Moroney (Columbia Nashville)
 Moxie Raia
 Alanis Morissette (Columbia SevenOne) (Europe)
 Mormon Tabernacle Choir
 Maren Morris (Columbia Nashville)
 Motion City Soundtrack
 Mudhoney
 Mudvayne
 Shawn Mullins
 Eddie Murphy
 Elliott Murphy
 Olly Murs

N

 Jim Nabors
 The Naked Brothers Band (Nickelodeon/Columbia)
 Natalie Maines
 Anna Nalick
 Nas
 Nature
 Naya Rivera (dropped)
 The Neighbourhood
 Willie Nelson (Columbia Nashville)
 Nena (CBS Schallplatten)
 N.E.R.D.
 Peter Nero
 The New Christy Minstrels
 New Kids on the Block
 Randy Newman
 Nice & Smooth (RAL/Columbia)
 Willie Nile
 Nine Inch Nails (Null Corp./Columbia) (US/Taiwan)
 NKOTBSB
 No Wyld
 Noemi
 Northern State

O

 OG Maco
 The O'Jays (Philadelphia International/Columbia)
 The O'Kanes (Columbia Nashville)
 The Oak Ridge Boys (Columbia Nashville)
 Oasis (Big Brother/Helter Skelter/Columbia) (US) 
 Frank Ocean 
 Odd Future
 The Offspring (1997–2013)
 Babatunde Olatunji
 Old Crow Medicine Show (Columbia Nashville)
 Ollabelle
 Joe "King" Oliver
 One Direction (Columbia) (US)
 OneRepublic*
 Onyx (JMJ/RAL/Chaos/Columbia)
 Oomph!
 Original Concept (Def Jam/Columbia)
 Eugene Ormandy (Columbia Masterworks)
 Our Lady Peace
 The Outfield
 OutKast
 Ozzy Osbourne

P

 Papa Roach
 Passion Pit
 Patti Page
 Polo G
 Michel Pagliaro
 Johan Palm
 Dolly Parton (Columbia Nashville)
 Billy Paul (Philadelphia International/Columbia)
 Les Paul and Mary Ford
 Pavlov's Dog (debut album leased from ABC Records)
 Peace
 Peach Pit (band)
 Pearl Jam
 Gayla Peevey
 Christine Perfect (Blue Horizon/CBS) (outside US/Canada)
 Katy Perry
 Steve Perry
 Julian Perretta
 Persephone's Bees
 Joe Pesci
 Philadelphia Orchestra (Columbia Masterworks)
 Edith Piaf
 Kellie Pickler (19/Columbia Nashville)
 Pink Floyd (outside Europe)
 Joe Piscopo
 Mary Kay Place
 Manitas de Plata
 Rachel Platten
 Play
 P.O.D.
 Pamela Polland
 Jean-Luc Ponty
 Powerman 5000
 Prairie Madness
 Pras (Ruffhouse/Columbia)
 Andy Pratt
 The Presidents of the United States of America
 Pretty Maids
 PrettyMuch
 Ray Price (Columbia Nashville)
 Primal Scream
 Prince (NPG/Columbia)
 Charles A. Prince
 Project Pat (Hypnotize Minds/Columbia)
 The Psycho Realm (Ruffhouse/Columbia)
 Public Enemy (Def Jam/Columbia)
 Gary Puckett & The Union Gap
 The Puppies (Chaos/Columbia)
 Ppcocaine (formerly known is trapbunnybubbles)

Q

 Carmel Quinn
 Quarashi
 Bill Quateman

R

 Joshua Radin
 Radiopilot
 Raekwon (Loud/Columbia)
 Rag 'N' Bone Man
 Rage Against the Machine
 A. R. Rahman
 Ramones 
 Jean-Pierre Rampal (Columbia Masterworks)
 Bella Ramsey
 Rancid
 The Rascals
 Raury (LoveRenaissance/Columbia)
 Genya Ravan
 The Raveonettes
 Raleigh Ritchie
 Lou Rawls (Philadelphia International/Columbia)
 Johnnie Ray
 Raze
 Tony Rebel (Chaos/Columbia)
 Red Rockers (415/Columbia)
 Mike Reid (Columbia Nashville)
 The Remix Master
 Return to Forever
 Paul Revere & the Raiders
 Nóirín Ní Riain
 Kyle Riabko
 Chase Rice (Dack Janiels/Columbia Nashville)
 Rich Kidz
 Ricochet (Columbia Nashville)
 Rip Chords
 Rise Against
 Roachford
 Marty Robbins (Columbia Nashville)
 Emma Roberts (Nickelodeon/Columbia)
 Robinella and the CC String Band
 Eileen Rodgers
 David Rogers (Columbia Nashville)
 The Rolling Stones (Rolling Stones/Columbia)
 Romeo Void (415/Columbia)
 Mark Ronson
 Robi Dräco Rosa 
 Rosalía 
 Charles Rosen 
 Lucy Rose
 Tim Rose
 Rick Ross
 Billy Joe Royal
 John Wesley Ryles (Columbia Nashville)
 Russ
 Ruth B
Rosa Linn

S

 Sum 41 (Canada)
 Stromae 
 Steve Angello
 Raphael Saadiq
 Bally Sagoo
 David Sanchez
 Roger Sanchez
 Felicia Sanders
 Arturo Sandoval
 Sandeé (Fever/RAL/Columbia)
 Santana
 Savage Garden (outside Australia/Japan)
 Save Ferris (Withyn/Columbia)
 Scandal
 Kristen Schaal (Comedy Central/Columbia)
 Janne Schaffer
 Patti Scialfa
 Raymond Scott
 Tom Scott
 Pete Seeger
 The Seekers
 Seiko
 Serart
 Rudolf Serkin 
 Serayah
 Shaggy
 Shakti
 Ravi Shankar
 Billy Joe Shaver (Columbia Nashville)
 Marlena Shaw
 Woody Shaw
 Dorothy Shay
 Shenandoah (Columbia Nashville)
 She & Him
 Ricky Van Shelton (Columbia Nashville)
 T.G. Sheppard (Columbia Nashville)
 The Shins (Aural Apothecary/Columbia)
 Dinah Shore
 Wayne Shorter
 Bobby Sichran
 The Silencers
 Silver Condor
Lu Ann Simms
 Simple Plan
 Simon & Garfunkel
 Paul Simon
 Carly Simon
 Jessica Simpson
 Frank Sinatra
 Red Skelton
 Slayer
 Sleeping with Sirens
 Bessie Smith
 Connie Smith
 Joanna Smith (Columbia Nashville)
 Kate Smith
 Lonnie Smith
 O. C. Smith
 Patti Smith
 Rex Smith
 Will Smith
 Jussie Smollett
 Phoebe Snow
 Social Distortion
 Solange
 Joanie Sommers
 Soul Asylum
 South Border (Philippines)
 South Central Cartel (GWK/DJ West/RAL/Chaos/Columbia)
 South Park (Comedy Central/Columbia/WMG)
 Spandau Ballet (CBS)
 Sparks (US)
 Lucy Spraggan
 Rick Springfield
 Bruce Springsteen
 Spiral Starecase
 Natasha St-Pier
 Stabbing Westward
 Jo Stafford
 Mary Stafford
 The Stanley Brothers
 Ralph Stanley
 The Statler Brothers (Columbia Nashville)
 Lennon Stella
 Chris Stapleton
 Stereo Skyline
 Stereomud 
 Isaac Stern 
 Cal Stewart
 Larry Stewart (Columbia Nashville)
 Doug Stone (Columbia Nashville) 
 Igor Strawinsky 
 Barbra Streisand
 The Stunners
 Harry Styles
 Selah Sue
 Sunscreem
 Super Cat
 Superchick
 Surface
 Sweathog
 The Sweet
 Sweethearts of the Rodeo (Columbia Nashville)
 Switchfoot
 Syd
 System of a Down (American Recordings/Columbia)
 George Szell

T

 T-Pain
 T-Square
 Gid Tanner & the Skillet Lickers
 Taproot
 Angel Taylor
 James Taylor (1977-2007)
 Johnnie Taylor
 Ten City
 Tenacious D
 Terminator X (P.R.O. Division/RAL/Columbia)
 Khleo Thomas
 Josh Thompson (Columbia Nashville)
 The Thorns
 Three Days Grace
 The Three Degrees (Columbia/Philadelphia International)
 Three 6 Mafia (Hypnotize Minds/Columbia)
 Charles Davis Tillman
 The Ting Tings
 Libby Titus
 Mia Doi Todd
 Satoshi Tomīe (C2/Columbia)
 Daniel Tosh (Comedy Central/Columbia)
 Toad The Wet Sprocket
 Tommy Tutone
 Mel Tormé
 Toto
 Trackmasters (Track Masters/Columbia)
 Train
 Meghan Trainor
 Trance Dance
 Translator (415/Columbia)
 The Tremeloes
 Rick Trevino (Columbia Nashville)
 Travis Tritt (Columbia Nashville)
 TripleS (MODHAUS/Columbia/Legacy) (US/Canada then Worldwide)
 Richard Tucker
 Orrin Tucker
 Tanya Tucker (Columbia Nashville)
 Leah Turner (Columbia Nashville)
 Twisted Wheel
 Bonnie Tyler
 Steve Tyrell
 Tye Tribbett & G.A.
 Tyga
 Tyler, The Creator
The Kid LAROI (Grade A)

U

 Magnus Uggla
 James Blood Ulmer
 The Used

V

 The Vaccines
 Jerry Vale
 Valencia
 Vampire Weekend
 Van Zant (Columbia Nashville)
 Sarah Vaughan
 The Vibrators
 Gilles Vigneault (Columbia of Canada)
 Andreas Vollenweider
 Grace VanderWaal
 VicTORIous Cast (including Ariana Grande, Elizabeth Gillies, Victoria Justice, Leon Thomas III and Matt Bennett) (Nickelodeon under Columbia)

W

 Walk Off the Earth (SlapDash/Columbia)
 Ron Wallace (Columbia Nashville)
 The Wallflowers
 Bruno Walter 
 Wanderléa
 Wardruna
 Warrant
 War Babies
 Dionne Warwick
 Muddy Waters
 Roger Waters
 Mike Watt
 André Watts (Columbia Masterworks)
 Jeff "Tain" Watts
 Jeff Wayne
 The Weather Girls
 Weather Report
 Joan Weber
 Weezer (Hurley only)
 Freddy Weller
 Koe Wetzel
 Wet (band)
 Kirk Whalum
 Wham! (US/Canada)
 Wheat
 Wheatus
 Whipping Boy
 Jack White (Third Man/Columbia)
 Maurice White
 Peter White
 White Denim
 Paul Whiteman
 Whitesnake (CBS, Japan)
 Whodini (So So Def/Columbia)
 Rusty Wier
 Wilderness Road
 Andy Williams
 Bert Williams
 James "D-Train" Williams
 Deniece Williams
 John Williams
 Michelle Williams
 Pharrell Williams
 Robbie Williams
 Trent Willmon (Columbia Nashville)
 Edith Wilson
 Gretchen Wilson (Columbia Nashville)
 Teddy Wilson
 Wilson Phillips
 Wings (US/Canada)
 Edgar Winter
 Johnny Winter
 Wire Train (415/Columbia)
 Michael Wolff
 Charles Wood (Columbia Masterworks)
 Ron Wood
 Worl-A-Girl (Chaos/Columbia)
 Rick Wright (outside Europe)
 Wu-Tang Clan (Loud/Columbia)

X

 Xscape (So So Def/Columbia)
 Xzibit (Loud/Columbia)
 Xikers (KQ Entertainment/Columbia) (US/Canada then Worldwide)
 The X-Ecutioners (Loud/Columbia)

 XXXTentacion (Bad Vibes Forever/columbia)

Y

 Billy Yates (Columbia Nashville)
 Lori Yates (Columbia Nashville)
 Yahritza y Su Esencia (Lumbre Music)
 Yelawolf
 Yes
 Pete Yorn
 Paul Young
 Tata Young
 Yazz the Greatest

Z

 Hector Zazou
 Zebrahead
 Denny Zeitlin
 Jo Jo Zep & The Falcons (USA/Canada, Screaming Targets through Full Moon/Columbia)
 Zhavia
 ZHU
 ZZ Top

See also 
 Columbia Records

References

Lists of recording artists by label
Columbia Records